South Lancaster may refer to a location in the United States:

 South Lancaster, Massachusetts
 South Lancaster, Wisconsin

See also
 Lancaster (disambiguation)